Chloroplatinic acid (also known as hexachloroplatinic acid) is an inorganic compound with the formula [H3O]2[PtCl6](H2O)x  (0 ≤ x ≤ 6).  A red solid, it is an important commercial source of platinum, usually as an aqueous solution.  Although often written in shorthand as H2PtCl6, it is the hydronium (H3O+) salt of the hexachloroplatinate anion. Hexachloroplatinic acid is highly hygroscopic.

Production

Hexachloroplatinic acid may be produced via a variety of methods. The most common of these methods involves dissolution of platinum in aqua regia. Other methods include exposing an aqueous suspension of platinum particles to chlorine gas, or via electrolysis. 

When produced by the aqua regia route, hexachloroplatinic acid is thought to arise by the following equation: 

The resulting orange/red solution can be evaporated to produce brownish red crystals.  Some authors suggest that hexachloroplatinic acid produced using this method is contaminated with nitrosonium hexachloroplatinate. Newer literature indicates that this is not the case, and that once the nitric acid has been driven off, samples prepared via this method contain no detectable nitrogen. 

Alternative methods have been investigated and described, often motivated by the avoidance of nitrogen contamination.

Reactions
When heated, hexachloroplatinic acid decomposes to platinum(IV) chloride.

Applications

Potassium determination

Chloroplatinic acid was popularized for the quantitative analysis of potassium. The potassium is selectively precipitated from solution as potassium hexachloroplatinate. Determinations were done in 85% (v/v) alcohol solutions with excess platinate ions, and the precipitated product was weighed.  Potassium could be detected for solutions as dilute as 0.02 to 0.2% (m/v).

This method for determination of potassium was advantageous compared to the sodium cobaltinitrite method used previously, since it required a single precipitation reaction. Gravimetric analysis of precipitated products has been supplanted by modern instrumental analysis methods such as ion selective electrodes, flame photometry, ICP-AES or ICP-MS.

Purification of platinum

Upon treatment with an ammonium salt, such as ammonium chloride, chloroplatinic acid converts to ammonium hexachloroplatinate, which precipitates as a solid. Upon heating in an atmosphere of hydrogen,  the ammonium salt converts to elemental platinum. Platinum is often isolated from ores or recycled from residues using this method.

Catalysis
Like many platinum compounds, chloroplatinic acid is a catalyst (or precatalyst) for hydrogenation and related reactions. As first reported by John Speier and colleagues from Dow Corning, it catalyzes the addition of hydrosilanes to olefins, i.e. hydrosilylation.  Early demonstration reactions used isopropanol solutions of trichlorosilane (SiHCl3) with pentenes. Prior work on the addition of silanes to alkenes required radical reactions that were inefficient. As well as with Karstedt's catalyst, Speier's catalyst enjoys widespread use for hydrosilylation, the main drawback is the deliquescent properties of the catalyst. 

It is generally agreed that chloroplatinic acid is a precursor to the actual catalyst.  A possible role for colloidal platinum or zero-valent complexes has also been considered.

Related compounds
Chloroplatinic acid prepared from aqua regia is proposed to contain nitrosonium hexachloroplatinate, (NO)2PtCl6.  Nitrosonium hexachloroplatinate is obtained by the reaction of nitrosyl chloride (NOCl) and platinum metal. Nitrosonium hexachloroplatinate has been found to react vigorously with water and hydrochloric acid, making contamination of chloroplatinic acid prepared with aqua regia with nitrosonium hexachloroplatinate unlikely.

References

Hydrogen compounds
Coordination complexes
Platinum(IV) compounds
Chlorides
Inorganic compounds
Chloro complexes
Hexachloroplatinates